Joseann Alexie Offerman (born March 10, 1994) is an American ring announcer, professional wrestler, and singer. She is best known for her time with WWE under the ring name JoJo. She was part of the E! Network reality television show Total Divas during the first season, which aired in 2013.

Early life 
Joseann Alexie Offerman was born in Los Angeles on March 10, 1994, the daughter of Dominican professional baseball player José Offerman. She is also of Mexican descent.

Professional wrestling career

WWE (2013–2021) 

In May 2013, Offerman joined WWE and E! Network's reality show Total Divas, which shows behind the scenes footage of select WWE Divas and a look into their personal lives.

At just 19 years old, Offerman made her main roster debut under the ring name "JoJo" on the June 26, 2013, episode of WWE Main Event, singing the entrance theme for Tons of Funk alongside The Funkadactyls (Cameron and Naomi). Her version of the song was later released on iTunes. The following week on Raw, JoJo appeared in a backstage segment also involving The Bella Twins, Natalya, The Funkadactyls, and Eva Marie. On the July 22 episode of Raw, JoJo along with the cast of Total Divas appeared on Miz TV, where she introduced herself to the crowd. JoJo sang the United States national anthem at SummerSlam on August 18.

On the August 26 episode of Raw, JoJo served as the special guest ring announcer during a singles match between Natalya and Brie Bella. After the match, WWE Divas Champion, AJ Lee interrupted Brie Bella's victory celebration by cutting a worked shoot promo on the cast of Total Divas. Following this, JoJo appeared at ringside to show support for her Total Divas co-stars during their matches. JoJo was booked in her first match on Raw on October 7, teaming with Natalya and Eva Marie in a winning effort against Alicia Fox, Rosa Mendes, and Aksana in a six diva tag-team match, however she was never tagged into the match. The Total Divas defeated The True Divas (Fox, Aksana, Divas Champion AJ, Kaitlyn, Mendes, Tamina Snuka and Summer Rae) in an elimination tag-team match at the Survivor Series pay-per-view, and the following night on Raw in a rematch, where she achieved her first in-ring victory after pinning and eliminating Tamina Snuka.

JoJo later moved to WWE's developmental territory NXT in late 2013, after it was confirmed she would not be returning to Total Divas for its second season. She subsequently became the ring announcer for NXT. In April 2015, JoJo was promoted to the main roster and began serving as the regular ring announcer on Main Event, SmackDown, Raw and pay-per-views as well as a backstage interviewer. She served as the RAW brand ring announcer from 2016 until 2018 and remained under contract until she quietly departed from the company in early 2021.

Other media 
Offerman was part of the main cast for the first season of the reality television show Total Divas produced by WWE and E!. The show began airing in July 2013. Offerman was replaced by Summer Rae for the second season.

Personal life 
Offerman is in a relationship with WWE wrestler Bray Wyatt. They have two children together: Knash Sixx (born May 18, 2019), and Hyrie Von (born May 28, 2020). Wyatt and Offerman became engaged on April 28th, 2022.

Awards and accomplishments 
 Wrestling Observer Newsletter
 Worst Worked Match of the Year (2013) – with Brie Bella, Cameron, Eva Marie, Naomi, Natalya, and Nikki Bella vs. AJ Lee, Aksana, Alicia Fox, Kaitlyn, Rosa Mendes, Summer Rae, and Tamina Snuka at Survivor Series

Filmography

Television

Discography

Singles

References

External links 

 
 
 

1994 births
21st-century American singers
American people of Dominican Republic descent
American female professional wrestlers
American professional wrestlers of Mexican descent
Living people
Participants in American reality television series
Professional wrestling announcers
Professional wrestling managers and valets
People from Toluca Lake, Los Angeles
21st-century American women singers
American actresses of Mexican descent